Lloyd Alma "Al" Mansell (born January 23, 1944) is an American former politician in the state of Utah. He served in the Utah State Senate as a Republican from the 10th district from 1995 to 2001. He also served stints as President of the Utah Senate, as well as Assistant Majority Leader.

He was born in Midvale, Utah and attended the University of Utah and worked as a real estate broker.

References

Living people
1944 births
Utah Republicans